Phasma reinwardtii is a large stick insect found in West Papua and Papua New Guinea.

References

External links 
 Images at phasmatodea.com

Phasmatidae
Phasmatodea of Asia